The Standard Drug No. 2 is a historic commercial building located in Kinston, Lenoir County, North Carolina.  It was built between 1918 and 1924, and is a two-story, brick Commercial Style with street level, plate-glass windows.  The interior retains an Art Deco-style lunch counter and pressed metal ceiling.  Sit-ins were held at the lunch counter in 1960 and 1961, to protest segregation.

It was listed on the National Register of Historic Places in 2014.

References

African-American history of North Carolina
Commercial buildings on the National Register of Historic Places in North Carolina
Art Deco architecture in North Carolina
Commercial buildings completed in 1924
Buildings and structures in Lenoir County, North Carolina
National Register of Historic Places in Lenoir County, North Carolina